Assisted zona hatching (AZH) is a procedure of assisted reproductive technology in which a small hole is made in the zona pellucida, using a micromanipulator, thereby facilitating zona hatching. Zona hatching is where the blastocyst gets rid of the surrounding zona pellucida to be able to implant in the uterus.

Efficacy
A systematic review and meta-analysis came to the result that assisted zona hatching is related to increased rates of clinical pregnancy and multiple pregnancy in women with previous repeated failure or frozen-thawed embryos. However, it is unlikely to increase clinical pregnancy rates when performed in fresh embryos transferred to unselected women, to those without poor prognosis or to women of advanced maternal age. Also, overall, there no evidence of a significant difference in live birth rate following assisted hatching compared with no assisted hatching.

References

Assisted reproductive technology
Human reproduction